"" ("With time") is a 1970 song written, composed and sung by the French artist Léo Ferré. It was recorded in October 1970 for volume 2 of his Amour Anarchie album, but the record label dismissed the song, seen as not suiting the general mood of others songs.

It was first released as a 45, then on a compilation LP in 1972 called .

This tragic and beautifully sad love song, inspired by Ferré's own disenchantment and recent breakup, was an instant classic. It is one of his most famous songs (along with Paris canaille), becoming with time the most constantly covered French song worldwide.

It was chosen by Arsene Wenger when he appeared on Desert Island Disks on 22 November 2020

Single cover 
The cover photography is by the photographer .

Personnel 
 Danielle Licari: vocals (uncredited) on "".
 The orchestra consists of session musicians hired for the recording.

Production 
 Arranger & conductor: Jean-Michel Defaye
 Engineering: 
 Executive producer: Richard Marsan

Covers and adaptations 
Avec le temps was performed, among others, by: Céline Dion, Bernard Lavilliers, Hiba Tawaji, Catherine Sauvage, Dalida, Philippe Léotard, Renée Claude, Henri Salvador, Catherine Ribeiro, Juliette Gréco, Alain Bashung, Michel Jonasz, Belinda Carlisle, Abbey Lincoln, Bertrand Cantat, Youn Sun Nah, the duet Brad Mehldau and Anne Sofie von Otter, Johnny Hallyday, Benjamin Biolay, Tony Hymas...

References

External links 
 English translation of Avec le temps.
 Avec le temps (YouTube)

Léo Ferré songs
Catherine Sauvage songs
Songs written by Léo Ferré
1971 singles
Barclay (record label) singles
1970 songs